Steve Edge may refer to:

Steve Edge (rugby league), Australian rugby league footballer
Steve Edge (born 1972), English comedian and actor
Steve Edge (lawyer) (born 1950), British corporate tax lawyer